Kashif Saleem (born Michael Jones; December 26, 1956 – September 25, 2016) was an American multi-instrumentalist, singer, songwriter, record producer, artist, composer, author, director and educator from New York City. As a teenager, Kashif joined the funk group B. T. Express. He studied Islam and changed his name from Michael Jones to Kashif. He later signed with Arista Records enjoying success as a solo artist.

Together with Stevie Wonder, he was considered a pioneer in urban music thanks to his specific synthesizer technology approach and the introduction of MIDI in his production.

Early life
Kashif was born Michael Jones on December 26, 1956 (Some media outlets list his birth year as 1959), in the Harlem neighborhood of New York City. His only connection to his birth family is his birth certificate, which indicates that his biological mother was incarcerated when he was four months old. He was immediately put in foster care. He was constantly abused physically and mentally by his foster parents, and at the age of six, he moved into a more stable foster home. His introduction to music came in the form of a $3.00 song flute when he was in elementary school. By age 12, with the mentoring of his junior high school music teacher (Robert Wedlaw) he had mastered several musical instruments and began performing in some of New York's night clubs (Copacabana (nightclub) and Lloyd Price's Turntable).

Career

Musician
In 1974, Kashif was recruited as a keyboard player and vocalist to join the funk band B. T. Express, whose credits included the hits "Express" and "Do It ('Til You're Satisfied)", among others. Seeking a more challenging musical assignment in 1978, Kashif exited B. T. Express and landed a job as a keyboardist for R&B musician Stephanie Mills.

1983–1989: Solo career and nominations
In 1983, Kashif signed with Arista Records as a solo artist. Introduced to Arista by Milton Allen, the artist development director, his self-titled debut album Kashif (1983) spawned the hits "I Just Gotta Have You (Lover Turn Me On)", "Stone Love", "Help Yourself to My Love", "Say Something Love", and the instrumental track "The Mood". With this release, Kashif was well received as an innovator in music, as R&B artists were only beginning to experiment with synthesizers and other electronic instruments. In 1984, his second album, Send Me Your Love resulted in two Grammy nominations, "Edgartown Groove", featuring Al Jarreau, and the instrumental "Call Me Tonight" along with the hits "Baby Don't Break Your Baby's Heart" and "Are You the Woman".

His other albums include Condition of the Heart (1985), Love Changes (1987) and Kashif (1989). On the Love Changes album, Exposé provided background vocals. 1989's Kashif included the cover of the Four Tops' hit "Ain't No Woman (Like the One I've Got)".

Record producer and activist

1981: "I'm in Love"
In 1981 Kashif wrote and produced the hit "I'm in Love" for Evelyn "Champagne" King, which was a shift in sound from King's "Shame" to a minimalist becoming Kashif's signature sound. The song revitalized King's career and branded Kashif as one of the most sought-after producers of the day. Over the next ten years, he created hits including "So Fine" for Howard Johnson, "Love Come Down", "Betcha She Don't Love You", and "Back to Love", among many others.

1983–1987
Kashif can be heard on releases by Kenny G, George Benson, Evelyn "Champagne" King, Johnny Kemp, Melba Moore, Dionne Warwick, Giorge Pettus, Stacy Lattisaw, Meli'sa Morgan, Exposé, the Wootens, Freda Payne, Whitney Houston, and others. His Grammy nominations are for the instrumentals "The Mood", "Call Me Tonight", "Edgartown Groove" featuring Al Jarreau.

In 1985, he received another Grammy nomination for another instrumental entitled "The Movie Song". He also wrote and produced "Inside Love" for his musical idol, George Benson. It was during this time that he met and launched the career of then unknown Kenny G with "Hi How Ya Doin" and "Tribeca".

In 1985, Kashif teamed up with then newcomer, Whitney Houston. The result was the hit "You Give Good Love". Kashif also produced and was her duet partner on "Thinking About You", a single track from Houston's 17-million selling (30 million until current day) debut album. The album became the bestselling debut album by a female artist. Kashif also produced "Where You Are" on Houston's second project, the result, a 15-million selling (25 million until current day) album entitled Whitney.

In 1987, he produced "Love Changes", a chart topper in which Me'lisa Morgan was his duet partner and that name was taken from his bestselling album, which had the same name. The track also appears on Meli'sa Morgan's album Good Love. Also contained on that album was another duet that yielded yet another international hit, the song "Reservations For Two" with Dionne Warwick. Between 1987 and 1989, Kashif continued to churn out the hits for Jermaine Jackson, The Stylistics, Melba Moore, George Benson, Stacy Lattisaw, and many others.

1996–2016
In 1996, with an invitation from the UCLA Extension program, Kashif created "Contemporary Record Production with Kashif". He also wrote and self-published the book "Everything You'd Better Know About the Record Industry"; it has sold over 375,000 copies worldwide.

In 2000, Kashif produced the theme song for the Para-Olympics, and wrote and produced "Brooklyn Breezes" for R&B singer Will Downing. He also co-produced along with George Duke the Duke Ellington Tribute CD for the Duke Ellington Foundation. On November 14, 2004, Kashif was inducted into the R&B Hall of Fame as a "Living Legend". That year Janet Jackson's hit "R&B Junkie" used a sample of "I'm in Love" written and produced by Kashif.

Growing up in the foster care system inspired Kashif to lend his time and energy to help find ways to improve the lives of the more than 518,000 young people who are in foster care every day in America. In 2006, he created and founded Team iCare Foundation and produced the very first Walk/Run for Foster Care at the Rose Bowl Stadium in Pasadena, California. The result was 247 individuals signed up to become foster parents. He also created the Mentorship Dinner Cruise for youth in foster care, an event where 200 youth went on a cruise in Marina Del Rey, California and were paired with 250 professionals in various industries for the purpose of creating mentoring relationships.

Kashif received community awards from the California State Senate, Governor Arnold Schwarzenegger, Los Angeles Mayor, Antonio Villariagosa, all five Los Angeles County members of the Board of Supervisors, the Los Angeles County Children & Family Services and others. In 2006, Kashif founded Kashif University, which was located on the campus of Morningside High School in Inglewood California. It is an integrated education and arts training program for at-risk-youth ages 8–18.

Kashif also wrote, directed, and produced commercials and corporate films for Hyundai Motors America, Casey Family Programs, UPS, St. Joseph Health System, Patten Academy, and many others. He produced and directed a ten-part documentary series entitled "The History of R&B Music and Its Influence on World Culture" for worldwide distribution.

He died of 'undetermined causes' on September 25, 2016.

Discography

Studio albums

Compilation albums

Singles

Notes
1. The documentary has not yet been released, nor an update if it is completed or is still in production. In 2014 an Indiegogo fundraiser was created that did not reach its target for the production.

References

External links

1956 births
2016 deaths
Record producers from New York (state)
American humanitarians
African-American Muslims
American multi-instrumentalists
American rhythm and blues singer-songwriters
Post-disco musicians
Singer-songwriters from New York (state)
Arista Records artists